Arielia cancellata is a species of sea snail, a marine gastropod mollusk in the family Mitromorphidae.

Description

Distribution
This marine species occurs in the Arafura Sea off Australia.

References

 Shuto, T. 1983. New turrid taxa from the Australian waters. Memoirs of the Faculty of Sciences of Kyushu University, Series D, Geology 25: 1-26

External links
 

cancellata
Gastropods described in 1983
Gastropods of Australia